Leandro Nicolás Díaz Baffico (born 24 March 1990) is an Uruguayan footballer.

He played for Deportes Melipilla during the 2014–15 Primera División de Chile season.

References
 Profile at BDFA 
 

1990 births
Living people
Uruguayan footballers
Uruguayan expatriate footballers
Danubio F.C. players
Deportes Melipilla footballers
Segunda División Profesional de Chile players
Expatriate footballers in Chile
Expatriate footballers in Brazil

Association football midfielders